Juan Martín Mugica Ferreira (also spelled Mujica, 22 December 1943 – 11 February 2016) was a Uruguayan football player and manager who represented his country at the 1970 FIFA World Cup.

Career
Mugica played club football for Rampla Juniors, Nacional, Lille OSC, RC Lens, Liverpool de Montevideo and Defensor Sporting.

Mugica made 22 appearances for the Uruguay national football team between 1966 and 1970, scoring 2 goals.

Honours

Club 
Alianza F.C.
 Primera División
 Champion: Clausura 2004

References

External links

1943 births
2016 deaths
Uruguayan footballers
Uruguay international footballers
Uruguayan Primera División players
Ligue 1 players
Ligue 2 players
Rampla Juniors players
Club Nacional de Football players
Lille OSC players
RC Lens players
Defensor Sporting players
Liverpool F.C. (Montevideo) players
1970 FIFA World Cup players
Uruguayan expatriate footballers
Expatriate footballers in France
Uruguayan football managers
Club Nacional de Football managers
Millonarios F.C. managers
Atlético Nacional managers
Independiente Medellín managers
Deportes Tolima managers
Deportivo Saprissa managers
L.D. Alajuelense managers
Expatriate football managers in Brazil
Expatriate football managers in Colombia
Expatriate football managers in Costa Rica
Expatriate football managers in El Salvador
Association football defenders
Montevideo Wanderers managers